The Counterculture Hall of Fame, managed by High Times magazine, is a hall of fame primarily dedicated to celebrating the counterculture and the people who helped shape it. The hall was created in 1997 by High Times editor Steven Hager. Inductions were held annually on Thanksgiving as part of the Cannabis Cup event in Amsterdam. 

A short documentary was typically shown to introduce the inductee(s) to the audience, and a silver Cannabis Cup was awarded to each inductee.

Inductees
 1997 Bob Marley
 1998 Louis Armstrong, Mezz Mezzrow
 1999 Jack Kerouac, Neal Cassady, Allen Ginsberg, William S. Burroughs
 2000 Ina May Gaskin
 2001 Paul Krassner
 2002 Bob Dylan, Joan Baez
 2003 Jack Herer
 2004 Stephen Gaskin
 2005 John Trudell
 2006 Rainbow Family veterans Barry "Plunker" Adams and Garrick Beck
 2007 Tommy Chong, Cheech Marin
 2008 Peter Tosh
 2009 Thomas King Forcade
 2010 Coke La Rock
 2011 The Brotherhood of Eternal Love founder John Griggs
 2012 Steven Hager
 2014 Sasha Shulgin and Ann Shulgin
 2015 The Grateful Dead

References

External links
History of the Cannabis Cup

Counterculture
Halls of fame in the Netherlands
Culture in Amsterdam
1997 establishments in the Netherlands
Cannabis-related lists